Gerhard Paul Geise (2 January 1930, Stendal – 11 April 2010, Dresden) was a German mathematician and professor of pure mathematics.

He died after a long serious illness in Dresden.

Works (selection)

 1961: Über ähnlich-veränderliche ebene Systeme
 1976: Senkrechte Projektion
 1977: Kegelschnitte, Kugel und Kartenentwürfe
 1979: Grundkurs lineare Algebra
 1980: Analytische Geometrie für Kristallgitter
 1991: Berührungskegelschnitte in Bézierdarstellung
 1994: Darstellende Geometrie
 1995: Analytische Geometrie

Literature
 Geise, Gerhard. In Dorit Petschel (Bearb.): Die Professoren der TU Dresden 1828–2003. Böhlau Verlag, Köln / Weimar / Vienna 2003, .

References
 
 
 

20th-century German mathematicians
Academic staff of TU Dresden
1930 births
2010 deaths
People from Stendal